Canada's Drag Race is a Canadian reality competition streaming television series, based on America's RuPaul's Drag Race. The series is produced by Blue Ant Studios and premiered on Crave in Canada and WOW Presents Plus internationally on July 2, 2020. The show documents Canadian drag queen Brooke Lynn Hytes in his search of the next "Canadian Drag Superstar". In January 2021, the show was renewed for a second season, which began airing in October that year. In November 2021, the show was renewed for a third season, which began airing in July 2022.

Series overview

Episodes

Season 1 (2020) 

Season 1 aired from July 2, 2020 to September 3, 2020. The season included Brooke Lynn Hytes, Stacey McKenzie, and Jeffrey Bowyer-Chapman as judges. In May 2020, Anastarzia Anaquway, BOA, Ilona Verley, Jimbo, Juice Boxx, Kiara, Kyne, Lemon, Priyanka, Rita Baga, Scarlett BoBo, and Tynomi Banks were revealed as the twelve competing queens for the first season. In the season finale, Priyanka won the competition, with Rita Baga and Scarlett BoBo as runners-up.

Season 2 (2021)

For the second season, Brooke Lynn Hytes remained as a judge, while Stacey McKenzie and Jeffrey Bowyer-Chapman were replaced by Brad Goreski, Amanda Brugel, and Traci Melchor. The twelve competitors were revealed to be Adriana, Beth, Eve 6000, Gia Metric, Icesis Couture, Kendall Gender, Kimora Amour, Océane Aqua-Black, Pythia, Suki Doll, Stephanie Prince, and Synthia Kiss. Season 2 started airing on October 14, 2021. The season concluded on December 16, 2021, with Icesis Couture, Kendall Gender, and Pythia as finalists. Icesis Couture took the title as "Canada's Next Drag Superstar."

Season 3 (2022)

For the third season, Brooke Lynn Hytes remained as a judge alongside Brad Goreski and Traci Melchor. Amanda Brugel did not return to the judges panel this season. The twelve competitors were revealed to be Bombae, Chelazon Leroux, Gisèle Lullaby, Halal Bae, Irma Gerd, Jada Shada Hudson, Kaos, Kimmy Couture, Lady Boom Boom, Miss Fiercalicious, Miss Moço, and Vivian Vanderpuss. Season 3 premiered on July 14, 2022 and concluded on September 8, 2022. Gisèle Lullaby won the competition with Jada Shada Hudson as runner-up.

References 

Canada's Drag Race
Canada